There have been four baronetcies created for persons with the surname Musgrave, one in the Baronetage of England, one in the Baronetage of Nova Scotia, one in the Baronetage of Ireland and one in the Baronetage of the United Kingdom. As of 2014 two of the creations are extant.

The Musgrave Baronetcy, of Hartley Castle in the County of Westmorland, was created in the Baronetage of England on 29 June 1611 for Richard Musgrave, Member of Parliament for Westmorland. He was the member of a family that had been settled at Musgrave in Westmorland for many centuries and of which an earlier member, Thomas Musgrave, was summoned to the House of Lords as Baron Musgrave in 1350 (see this title for more information). The second Baronet represented Westmorland in the House of Commons and served with distinction as a Royalist in the Civil War. He was offered a peerage as Baron Musgrave, of Hartley Castle in the County of Westmorland, but did not take up the patent. The fourth Baronet sat as Member of Parliament for Carlisle, Westmorland, Appleby, Oxford University and Totnes. The fifth Baronet represented Carlisle and Cumberland in Parliament while the sixth Baronet represented Westmorland. The eighth Baronet sat as Member of Parliament for Petersfield and Carlisle and the eleventh Baronet sat for Cumberland East and served as Lord-Lieutenant of Westmorland.

The family seat was Hartley Castle, near Kirkby Stephen, Cumbria.

The Musgrave Baronetcy, of Hayton Castle in the County of Cumberland, was created in the Baronetage of Nova Scotia on 20 October 1638 for Edward Musgrave. The third Baronet represented Cumberland in the House of Commons. The title became extinct on the death of the tenth Baronet in 1875.

The Musgrave Baronetcy, of Tourin in the County of Waterford, was created in the Baronetage of Ireland on 2 December 1782 for Richard Musgrave, a member of the Irish House of Commons, with remainder in default of male issue of his own to his younger brothers and the heirs male of the body. On his death in 1818 he was succeeded according to the special remainder by his younger brother Christopher Frederick, the second Baronet. The third Baronet sat as Member of Parliament for County Waterford. The fourth Baronet served as Lord-Lieutenant of County Waterford.

The family seat was Tourin House, near Cappoquin, County Waterford.

The Musgrave Baronetcy, of Drumglass in the County of Antrim, was created in the Baronetage of the United Kingdom on 4 March 1897 for the industrialist and philanthropist James Musgrave. The title became extinct on his death in 1904.

Musgrave baronets, of Hartley Castle (1611)

Sir Richard Musgrave, 1st Baronet (–1615)
Sir Philip Musgrave, 2nd Baronet (1607–1678)
Sir Richard Musgrave, 3rd Baronet (died 1687)
Sir Christopher Musgrave, 4th Baronet (–1704)
Sir Christopher Musgrave, 5th Baronet (1688–1736)
Sir Philip Musgrave, 6th Baronet (–1795)
Sir John Chardin Musgrave, 7th Baronet (1757–1806)
Sir Philip Musgrave, 8th Baronet (1794–1827)
Sir Christopher John Musgrave, 9th Baronet (–1834)
Sir George Musgrave, 10th Baronet (1799–1872)
Sir Richard Courtenay Musgrave, 11th Baronet (1838–1881)
Sir Richard George Musgrave, 12th Baronet (1872–1926)
Sir Nigel Courtenay Musgrave, 13th Baronet (1896–1957)
Sir Charles Musgrave, 14th Baronet (1913–1970)
Sir Christopher Patrick Charles Musgrave, 15th Baronet (born 1949)

The heir presumptive is the present holder's only brother Julian Nigel Chardin Musgrave (born 1951).

Musgrave baronets, of Hayton Castle (1638)
Sir Edward Musgrave, 1st Baronet (c. 1621–1673)
Sir Richard Musgrave, 2nd Baronet (c. 1650–1710)
Sir Richard Musgrave, 3rd Baronet (c. 1675–1711)
Sir Richard Musgrave, 4th Baronet (c. 1701–1739)
Sir Richard Hylton, 5th Baronet (c. 1724–1755)
Sir William Musgrave, 6th Baronet (1735–1800), FRS (1774), FSA (1778) ... a promoter of literature, & well known for a valuable collection illustrating the History of England, ... 
Sir Thomas Musgrave, 7th Baronet (1737–1812), Colonel of the 76th Regiment of Foot
Sir James Musgrave, 8th Baronet (c. 1752–1814)
Sir James Musgrave, 9th Baronet (1785–1858)
Sir William Augustus Musgrave, 10th Baronet (1792–1875)

Musgrave baronets, of Tourin (1782)
Sir Richard Musgrave, 1st Baronet, of Tourin (1746–1818)
Sir Christopher Frederick Musgrave, 2nd Baronet (1738–1826)
Sir Richard Musgrave, 3rd Baronet (1790–1859)
Sir Richard Musgrave, 4th Baronet (1820–1874)
Sir Richard John Musgrave, 5th Baronet (1850–1930)
Sir Christopher Norman Musgrave, 6th Baronet (1892–1956)
Sir Richard James Musgrave, 7th Baronet (1922–2000)
Sir Christopher John Shane Musgrave, 8th Baronet (born 1959)

The heir presumptive is the present holder's only brother Michael Shane Musgrave (born 1968).

Musgrave baronets, of Drumglass (1897)
Sir James Musgrave, 1st Baronet (1829–1904)

Notes

References 
Kidd, Charles, Williamson, David (editors). Debrett's Peerage and Baronetage (1990 edition). New York: St Martin's Press, 1990, 

 

Baronetcies in the Baronetage of England
Baronetcies in the Baronetage of Ireland
Extinct baronetcies in the Baronetage of Nova Scotia
Extinct baronetcies in the Baronetage of the United Kingdom
Baronetcies created with special remainders
1611 establishments in England
Musgrave family